Eximiorhagada is a genus of air-breathing land snails, terrestrial pulmonate gastropod mollusks in the family Camaenidae.

Species 
Species within the genus Amphidromus include:
 Eximiorhagada asperrima

References 

 Australian Biological Resources Study info

 
Camaenidae
Taxonomy articles created by Polbot